Toma Tomov (born 21 May 1958) is a retired Bulgarian athlete who specialized in the 400 metres hurdles.

International competitions

External links

1958 births
Living people
Bulgarian male hurdlers
Athletes (track and field) at the 1988 Summer Olympics
Olympic athletes of Bulgaria
World Athletics Championships athletes for Bulgaria
Competitors at the 1986 Goodwill Games
Friendship Games medalists in athletics